This list is about Örgryte IS players with at least 100 league appearances. For a list of all Örgryte IS players with a Wikipedia article, see :Category:Örgryte IS players. For the current Örgryte IS first-team squad, see First-team squad.

Players
Matches of current players as of 27 March 2014.

References

 
Players
Orgryte IS
Association football player non-biographical articles